The 25th National Television Awards were held at The O2 Arena on 28 January 2020, and was the only time to be hosted by David Walliams.

Performances
Pet Shop Boys – "Monkey Business"

Awards

Programmes with multiple nominations

Programmes with multiple wins

References

External links
 

National Television Awards
N
2020 in British television
N
National
National Television Awards